The FIA WTCR Race of Spain is a round of the World Touring Car Championship, which was held at the Circuit Ricardo Tormo near the city of Valencia in Spain. The race ran at Valencia every year from the return of the series in 2005 season through to 2012. The event was initially kept on the 2013 calendar without a venue being confirmed, it was later dropped entirely from the schedule.

Jordi Gené is the only Spanish driver to win their home race. He won the first race in 2005 from pole position driving for native manufacturer SEAT.

This round has returned to WTCR from 2020, but the venue is MotorLand Aragón now.

Winners

FIA WTCR Race of Aragón

Due to the cancellation of WTCR Race of Italy in 2020 World Touring Car Cup, another race was added after WTCR Race of Spain as season-finale of the 2020 WTCR season, which was called as WTCR Race of Aragón. In rder to make difference from the previous race, chicanes were used on the backstraight of circuit. The race was held on 14–15 November 2020.

Winners

References

Spain
Spain
World Touring Car Championship